The New Avengers is a secret agent action television series produced during 1976 and 1977. It is a sequel to the 1960s series The Avengers and was developed by original series producers Albert Fennell and Brian Clemens.

The series was produced by The Avengers (Film and TV) Enterprises Ltd for the ITV network, cost £125,000 per episode to produce at Pinewood Studios, and was seen in 120 countries.

A joint United Kingdom-France-Canada production, the series picks up the adventures of John Steed (again played by Patrick Macnee) as he and his team of "Avengers" fight evil plots and world domination. Whereas in the original series Steed had almost always been partnered with a woman, in the new series he had two partners: Mike Gambit (Gareth Hunt), a top agent, crack marksman and trained martial artist, and Purdey (Joanna Lumley), a former trainee with The Royal Ballet (to which she ascribed the high-kicking skills she frequently used in the series) who was an amalgam of many of the best talents from Steed's female partners in The Avengers.

Overview
As he did for most of the original Avengers series, John Steed is once again acting without a direct superior—in many ways his character takes on the duties of "Mother" from the Tara King era of that series. Steed is seen to be the mentor to Mike Gambit and Purdey, taking on a paternal role towards them (especially in the episode "Hostage"). Gambit is the athletic action hero, while Purdey incorporates the wit and fighting skills of her predecessors. The verbal interplay between Gambit and Purdey, with her humorously keeping his romantic advances at bay, harks back to the Steed/Cathy Gale era of The Avengers.

One reason for the addition of Gambit was the question of whether Macnee, aged 53 when the series began production, could handle the potential stuntwork and action scenes. Macnee was able to increase his role's visibility as the series progressed, losing weight to improve his athleticism and "keep up" with his new partners.

The first series featured several episodes using science fiction themes similar to those of the classic "Emma Peel" Avengers era. The new trio had to deal with suspended animation ("The Eagle's Nest"), biological warfare ("The Midas Touch"), robotics ("The Last of The Cybernauts?"), mind transfer ("Three-Handed Game") and even a giant rat ("Gnaws", a title patterned after the hit movie Jaws). Second series episodes featured science fiction elements, such as the artificially-intelligent super-computer of "Complex", the Russian soldiers revived from suspended animation in "K is for Kill", the submersible Russian community in "Forward Base" and the superhumans of "The Gladiators". Other episodes of that season dealt with more realistic plots.

The Avengers and The New Avengers scriptwriter Dennis Spooner said that at the end of its run The Avengers had gone as far as it could in terms of parody. For this reason, producer Brian Clemens intentionally aimed for real stories and straight, Len Deighton-type spy stories in The New Avengers. Spooner explained that "it's no good saying 'I don't like The New Avengers so much, because it wasn't like the old show'-because it never could have been. We did everything – we did the kitchen sink! – and there was no way of going back on it". When reminded of his The New Avengers script "Gnaws", Spooner admitted that "well, yes, towards the end we relaxed a bit!" Some of the storylines used in the series were recycled from earlier scripts penned by Clemens or Spooner from other series. "Medium Rare" was based on the episode "Murder in Mind" of the British series Thriller, and "Gnaws" was based on the Thunderbirds story "Attack of the Alligators!"

An attempt to get Diana Rigg to appear as Emma Peel in the new series was unsuccessful, although old footage of her on the phone from two 1960s episodes of The Avengers ("The Winged Avenger" and "The Hidden Tiger") were used to allow the character to make a cameo appearance in the episode "K Is For Kill Part One: The Tiger Awakes": Sue Lloyd provided the voice of Mrs Peel for these sequences. Ian Hendry, who in the early 1960s had played Steed's original partner, David Keel, also guest-starred in one episode, "To Catch A Rat", playing a different role.  "Obsession" features two of the stars of the Brian Clemens/Albert Fennell British crime-fighting action series The Professionals: Martin Shaw and Lewis Collins.

Two series totalling 26 episodes were produced, which were aired on CBS in the United States, CTV in Canada, ITV in Britain, RTÉ in Ireland, ABC in Australia, TF1 in France, TVE1 in Spain and in syndication elsewhere.

Laurie Johnson, who had composed the theme used from 1965 onward for the original Avengers series, returned to compose a new, updated theme for the revival, although it begins with the same fanfare as the original.

In order to complete the planned 26 episodes, finance was sought from other sources. Production company Nielsen Ferns came on board but was understandably keen to promote its home country, so the final four stories, titled The New Avengers in Canada on the caption card preceding each episode, saw the action move to Toronto, Ontario (with scenes for the episode "Forward Base" shot at Ward's Island). Brian Clemens was by this time heavily committed to working on The Professionals for LWT, and control of the series passed to a largely local crew. The results attracted heavy criticism both from fans and from Clemens himself.

The financial problems continued and plans for a third series were abandoned. Subsequently, however, strong sales to many countries—notably CBS in the United States—saw two attempts to revive the show (in 1979 and 1980), though co-financing arrangements proved impossible to agree upon.

Brian Clemens was invited to write a pilot for Quinn Martin's QM Productions. Entitled Escapade, the pilot episode was broadcast on CBS in 1978, and starred Granville Van Dusen and Morgan Fairchild as Joshua and Suzy – Gambit and Purdey equivalents. It was not picked up as a series.

In 1994, Joanna Lumley and Gareth Hunt publicised the launch of the series on domestic videocassette. Sales were stronger than expected, prompting Brian Clemens to consider reuniting the two actors in a "spin-off" series. Although both were keen to participate and a script was written, plans stalled at an early stage for undisclosed reasons.

In 1995/6, the series was picked up by the BBC for a repeat run (Joanna Lumley subsequently claimed that this is the only screening for which she received repeat fees). At the time, French company Canal Plus held transmission prints for the series, but upon delivery the BBC considered that those for several early episodes were not of "broadcast quality". As a result, the final four episodes were actually the first to be screened, whilst better prints of the others were made up. Nevertheless, notable variations in picture and audio quality across the series remain, and it awaits genuine remastering from the original 35 mm negatives/interpositives.

The series began a repeat run on BBC Four on 13 November 2008. This was the first time the series had been networked since its screening by the BBC in 1995. UK channel ITV4 started broadcasting the first series in January 2013.

The series was re-run sequentially on ITV4 in September 2014, starting with "The Eagle's Nest". As with other series such as The Professionals and Batman, episodes were shown in the evening slot and then repeated the morning after.

In July 2018, UK freeview channel True Entertainment began a re-run of the entire series. Previously they had also shown the original Avengers.  On 4 January 2021 True Entertainment's replacement channel Sony Channel began a repeat showing of The New Avengers beginning with series 1, episode 1, "The Eagle's Nest" (whilst the rights to show the original Avengers TV series in 2021 are with ITV).

Episodes
Airdates given here are for a transmission on ATV (Midlands); other ITV regions' air dates vary.

Series 1 (1976–77)

1 The DVD order has also been used for ITV4 repeats, and reflects the original production order.

Series 2 (1977)

All prints of the final four episodes of series 2 begin with a sting of the theme tune over a cue card, which reads The New Avengers in Canada.

"K Is for Kill" is titled "The Dragon Awakes" ("Der Drache erwacht") in Germany and "The Long Sleep" ("Le Long Sommeil") in France.

Spin-offs

Novels
The New Avengers spawned a series of novels based on episode scripts. Only three were published in the US:

 House of Cards, Peter Cave, 1976
 The Eagle's Nest, John Carter, 1976 (The Eagle's Nest and The Midas Touch)
 To Catch a Rat, Walter Harris, 1977
 Fighting Men, Justin Cartwright, 1977 (Dirtier by the Dozen)
 The Cybernauts, Cave, 1977 (The Last of the Cybernauts)
 Hostage, Cave, 1977

Comics
Two hardback annuals of The New Avengers were also published in the UK, containing self-contained comics strip adventures, short fiction and features:

 The New Avengers Annual (1977), Brown Watson – comics strips Fangs for the Memory, drawn by John Bolton (uncredited); Hypno-twist, drawn by John Bolton (signed).
 The New Avengers Annual (1978), Brown Watson – comics strips Midas Touch, drawn by Pierre Le Goff; The Cybernauts, drawn by Pierre Le Goff.

Home release
The complete series is available on DVD in both the UK and North America. A&E Home Video, under license from StudioCanal International released the Region 1 editions of series 1 in 2003 and series 2 in 2004, while Optimum/Studio Canal released both series as a single set in 2006.

References

External links
 
 The Authorised Guide to The New Avengers
 Documentary 

1976 British television series debuts
1977 British television series endings
1976 Canadian television series debuts
1977 Canadian television series endings
The Avengers (TV series)
Canadian action television series
British action television series
CBS original programming
CTV Television Network original programming
ITV television dramas
Television series produced at Pinewood Studios
Espionage television series
Television series set in 1976
Television series set in 1977
1970s British drama television series
Sequel television series